Wolfshead is the title of a short story about lycanthropy by American author Robert E. Howard, first published in the April 1926 issue of pulp magazine Weird Tales, as well as the title of a posthumously-published collection of seven novelettes by the same author, named after the story "Wolfshead", which it includes. The collection spans and blends the genres of weird fiction, horror, Norse mythology, sword and sorcery, fantasy, supernatural fiction, historical fiction and the weird West. It was first published by Lancer. Five of the novelettes had previously been published in the pulp magazine Weird Tales, and one each in Avon Fantasy Reader and Strange Tales.

Contents

 Introduction by Robert E. Howard
 The Black Stone
 The Valley of the Worm
 Wolfshead
 The Fire of Asshurbanipal
 The House of Arabu
 The Horror from the Mound
 The Cairn on the Headland

References

External links
 

Fantasy short story collections
Short story collections by Robert E. Howard
1968 short story collections
Lancer Books books